Lokstene Shrine of Dievturi is a Dievturi religious building in Aizkraukle Municipality, in the Vidzeme region of Latvia. It was inaugurated in 2017 and is used by the organization Latvijas Dievturu sadraudze for devotional ceremonies and annual celebrations.

History

The project to build a modern shrine for Baltic paganism was initiated and financed by Dagnis Čākurs, owner of the Liepkalni bakery chain. Čākurs explained that as he had grown older, he had become more interested in questions about the soul and mortality. As the Latvian people had supported his business over the years, he wanted to give something in return, and hoped to do so with a house for the national gods and Latvian folk culture. He attributed his interest in Latvian paganism to Valdis Celms, an artist, author and leading member of the Baltic neopagan organization Latvijas Dievturu sadraudze (LDS).

The Lokstene Shrine was constructed on an island owned by Čākurs and is named after the nearby Lokstene castle mound. It is leased by LDS, which began to use the building in the autumn of 2016, before the entire complex was finished. The official opening took place on 6 May 2017. Since then, it has hosted regular devotional ceremonies and celebrations, such as family celebrations, celebrations of moral and spiritual values, and celebration of the Latvian national day.

Anita Liepiņa of the literary magazine Jaunā Gaita argued in 2017 that the building deserves to receive state support just like Christian churches receive support for maintenance.

Architecture and design
The Lokstene Shrine is located on a small island in the Daugava river, behind the Liepkalni bakery and café in Liepsalas, close to the town Pļaviņas. The entire complex includes a shrine building, a ferry, an assembly and flag square, a monument to the ancestors, and a gate of the sun.

The design was developed by LDS under the leadership of Celms. The architect was Ainārs Markvarts. The interior design was created by Andrejs Broks and Egons Garklāvs. The sculptor was Jānis Karlovs.

See also
List of modern pagan temples
Romuva (temple)

References

External links 
Official website 

Baltic modern paganism
Religious buildings and structures completed in 2017
Modern paganism in Latvia
Religious buildings and structures in Latvia
Modern pagan buildings
Aizkraukle Municipality
Vidzeme
2010s in modern paganism